The ASW 28 is a Standard Class glider with a fifteen-metre span built of modern fibre reinforced composites. The manufacturer of the ASW-28 is Alexander Schleicher GmbH & Co. The 'W' indicates this is a design of the influential and prolific German designer Gerhard Waibel. Serial production started in 2000.

Design and development
The ASW 28 is a single-seat shoulder-winged composite construction sailplane with a T-shaped horizontal tailplane and 15 metre wingspan. The upper wing surface has Schempp-Hirth airbrakes.

As all Standard Class sailplanes, the ASW-28 does not have flaps or other lift-enhancing devices. It has tall winglets, a retractable undercarriage and a water ballast system. The structure is a complex composite of carbon, aramid and polyethylene fibre reinforced plastic. This permits a light structure with the strength to carry large amounts of water ballast, thus permitting the widest possible range of wing loadings for weak and strong soaring weather.

The ASW-28 supersedes the ASW 24 in the manufacturer's production line. It has – like its competitors Rolladen-Schneider LS8 and Schempp-Hirth Discus-2 – a version with wing extensions for the increasingly popular 18 metre Class, the ASW 28-18. The sustainer (non-self-launching) variant of the 18 metre version is the ASW 28-18 E. The sustainer uses a SOLO 2350 18 hp two-stroke engine.

Variants
ASW 28
Production variant with 15 metre wingspan.
ASW 28-18
Production variant with either a 15 metre or 18 metre span, also optional engine installation.
ASW 28-18 E
Production variant with a 13.2 kW (18 hp) SOLO 2350 2-stroke sustainer engine.

Specifications (with 15 metre wings)

See also

References

Alexander Schleicher GmbH & Co
Sailplane Directory
Simons M, Segelflugzeuge 1965–2000, Eqip, 2004

2000s German sailplanes
Schleicher aircraft
T-tail aircraft
Shoulder-wing aircraft
Aircraft first flown in 2000